La Quinta (Spanish for )  is a desert resort city in Riverside County, California, United States. Located between Indian Wells and Indio, it is one of the nine cities of the Coachella Valley. The population was 37,467 at the 2010 census, up from 23,694 at the 2000 census. The Robb Report credits La Quinta as the leading golf destination in the US. Among those destinations is the La Quinta Resort and Club, a resort dating to 1926, where director Frank Capra wrote the screenplay for Lost Horizon. The Tom Fazio-designed golf course at The Quarry at La Quinta is ranked among the top 100 golf courses in the United States.  In January 2008, the Arnold Palmer Classic Course at the city's SilverRock Golf Resort became one of the four host golf courses for the annual Bob Hope Chrysler Classic PGA golf tournament.

History
The Cahuilla Indians were the first inhabitants of La Quinta.

In the late-19th century and early-20th century (1880–1920), agriculture developed in present-day La Quinta and "East Valley" by pre-modern (mountain water runoff or open water springs) and modern irrigation techniques. At the time, California and federal land surveyors declared the sand dunes uninhabitable, only the hard rock ground of the "Marshall Cove" held potential farming and residential development. 

In 1926, Walter Morgan established the La Quinta Resort at the northern section of Marshall Cove as a type of secluded hideaway for nearby Hollywood's celebrities and socialites. The Resort was the site for the Coachella Valley's first golf course, coinciding with the construction and pavement of State Route 111 in the 1930s. Further expansion of Washington Street in the 1950s and 1960s connected La Quinta with US Highways 60 and 99 (became Interstate 10 in the 1970s).

As nearby desert cities grew to capacity, La Quinta's growth rose dramatically by the mid-1980s, which led to its incorporation as a city in Riverside County in 1982. In the 1980 census, La Quinta had 4,200 residents, then increased to 11,215 by 1990 in the city's early phases of residential area growth. It was predominantly a part-time community until around that time.

Geography
The city's elevation is 56 feet (20 m) above sea level.

La Quinta is located on the floor of the Coachella Valley, and is surrounded almost entirely by the Santa Rosa Mountains. As the floor of the valley sank, it was covered by the Pacific Ocean. Silt deposits from the flow of the Colorado River into the Gulf of California caused the basin to be cut off from the ocean. Five hundred years ago, the Colorado River changed its course and the eastern Coachella Valley flooded, leading to the creation of Lake Cahuilla, which was fresh water.

Santa Rosa Mountains

The most prominent feature of the La Quinta area is its Santa Rosa Mountains. Visitors to Disney California Adventure Park in Anaheim, California, and EPCOT at the Walt Disney World Resort in Bay Lake, Florida, are treated to a brief glimpse of the foothills in one of the park's attractions: Soarin' Over California.  The "Palm Springs" segment of Soarin' Over California was actually shot at the world-famous PGA West golf complex in La Quinta. The Santa Rosa Mountains (California) are nestled against the golf course and can be seen easily in the segment.

The area is very close to the earthquake-causing San Andreas Fault, with some companies offering jeep tours to the fault line.

Climate
The climate of the Coachella Valley is influenced by the surrounding geography. High mountain ranges on three sides contribute to its unique and year-round warm climate, with some of the warmest winters west of the Rocky Mountains. Under  of annual precipitation are average, with over 348 days of sunshine per year.

Surrounding cities
The estimated 2012 population was 38,075, similar to Palm Springs. La Quinta grew at a higher rate than most other cities in California during the 1990s and 2000s.

La Quinta is in the Coachella Valley and is relatively close to all major cities in that valley, including:

Economy

Tourism
The city enjoys a healthy tourism industry, especially during the cooler winter months in which "snowbird" tourists arrive. The most prominent industry is golfing with more than twenty golf courses, including the world-famous PGA West, which has hosted prestigious tournaments such as The Skins Game, Bob Hope Chrysler Classic, The Grand Slam of Golf, The Legends of Golf, as well as the PGA Tour Qualifying School. La Quinta has increased the number of retail shopping centers, both discount and high-end retailers brought millions of revenue dollars to the city, and the city council hopes for La Quinta to share a reputation for shoppers like Palm Desert (El Paseo) and Palm Springs (the Village and Palm Canyon) by the end of the decade.

Service industries
In addition to standard service industries, La Quinta is the site of the first Wal-Mart Supercenter in California. Moreover, many residents work for the tourist industries in hotels, resorts, golf courses, and nearby Vegas-style casinos, such as: Spa Resort Casino, Agua Caliente Casino, Spotlight 29, Fantasy Springs and Augustine Casino. There are many service industry jobs related to the construction, hotel, landscaping, and retail industries. La Quinta has sought to bring in high-paying professional businesses to the city and has benefited from neighboring cities' growth (Indio, Palm Desert and Palm Springs). The city's downtown commercial district is officially known as "The Village."  The Village District includes private commercial developments such as "Old Town" and "Plaza Calle Tampico," and contains many professional offices, the City museum, small tourist-oriented shops and boutiques, and several restaurants.

 Old Town La Quinta
Old Town La Quinta is a commercial real estate development that was founded and developed by Wells Marvin.  It consists of 30 cafes, shops, boutiques, salons, and services as well as 20 office spaces on the 2nd story above the businesses.  The town hosts Art on Main St. and La Quinta's Farmers Market.  

In 2001 Wells purchased six acres of land and decided to create a Main Street, inspired by Spanish Colonial architecture in Santa Barbara, Carmel as well as small European towns he had lived in as a child.  Old Town opened in 2003 and is situated on Calle Tampico, Desert Club Drive, Avanidas Bermudas, and Calle La Fonda.

Top employers
According to La Quinta's 2020 Comprehensive Annual Financial Report, the top employers in the city were:

Demographics

2012
As of January 1, 2012, the California Department of Finance Demographic Research Unit estimates the City of La Quinta's population to be 38,075.

2010
The 2010 United States Census reported that La Quinta had a population of 37,467. The racial makeup of La Quinta was 29,489 (78.7%) White (63.1% Non-Hispanic White), 713 (1.9%) African American, 230 (0.6%) Native American, 1,176 (3.1%) Asian, 41 (0.1%) Pacific Islander, 4,595 (12.3%) from other races, and 1,223 (3.3%) from two or more races. Hispanic or Latino of any race were 11,339 persons (30.3%).

The Census reported that 37,410 people (99.8% of the population) lived in households, 50 (0.1%) lived in non-institutionalized group quarters, and 7 (0%) were institutionalized.

There were 14,820 households, out of which 4,329 (29.2%) had children under the age of 18 living in them, 8,672 (58.5%) were opposite-sex married couples living together, 1,442 (9.7%) had a female householder with no husband present, 595 (4.0%) had a male householder with no wife present.  There were 787 (5.3%) unmarried opposite-sex partnerships, and 182 (1.2%) same-sex married couples or partnerships. 3,164 households (21.3%) were made up of individuals, and 1,522 (10.3%) had someone living alone who was 65 years of age or older. The average household size was 2.52.  There were 10,709 families (72.3% of all households); the average family size was 2.93.

The population was spread out, with 8,208 people (21.9%) under the age of 18, 2,509 people (6.7%) aged 18 to 24, 7,696 people (20.5%) aged 25 to 44, 11,238 people (30.0%) aged 45 to 64, and 7,816 people (20.9%) who were 65 years of age or older.  The median age was 45.6 years. For every 100 females, there were 93.5 males.  For every 100 females age 18 and over, there were 91.3 males.

The homeowner vacancy rate was 6.5%; the rental vacancy rate was 16.5%.  27,386 people (73.1% of the population) lived in owner-occupied housing units and 10,024 people (26.8%) lived in rental housing units.

According to the 2010 United States Census, La Quinta had a median household income of $72,099, with 8.0% of the population living below the federal poverty line.

2000

As of the census of 2000, there were 23,694 people, 8,445 households, and 6,553 families residing in the city. The racial makeup of the city was 78.5% White, 1.4% African American, 0.7% Native American, 1.9% Asian, 0.1% Pacific Islander, 13.9% from other races, and 3.5% from two or more races. Hispanic or Latino of any race were 32.0% of the population.

There were 8,445 households, out of which 38.1% had children under the age of 18 living with them, 64.6% were married couples living together, 9.2% had a female householder with no husband present, and 22.4% were non-families. 17.0% of all households were made up of individuals, and 6.6% had someone living alone who was 65 years of age or older.  The average household size was 2.8 and the average family size was 3.2, above national average of 2.4 according to the 2000 United States Census.

In the city, the population was spread out, with 29.1% under the age of 18, 6.0% from 18 to 24, 29.0% from 25 to 44, 22.4% from 45 to 64, and 13.4% who were 65 years of age or older.  The median age was 36 years. For every 100 females, there were 96.2 males.  For every 100 females age 18 and over, there were 93.1 males.

The median income for a household in the city was $54,552, and the median income for a family was $56,848 (these figures had risen to $72,452 and $82,168 respectively as of a 2007 estimate). Males had a median income of $40,553 versus $31,627 for females. The per capita income for the city was $27,284.  About 5.0% of families and 7.8% of the population were below the poverty line, including 11.1% of those under age 18 and 4.8% of those age 65 or over.

Other demographic data 

La Quinta has developed a culturally diverse community, as large ancestry groups include Mexicans (the largest) and Mexican Americans who frequently came to the Palm Springs area/Coachella Valley to find available employment in the 1990s and 2000s. Others, in alphabetical order, include: Armenians, Bosnians, British, French, Germans, Italians, Poles and Jews of multiple nationalities.

Temporary population known as "snowbird" from Coastal California urban areas, the Pacific Northwest and/or Canada increase the local population by 50–90% in the winter months from November to April. A large percentage of seasonal residents are senior citizens and RV or mobile home parks are scattered throughout "East Valley" – the eastern half of the Coachella Valley.

Like the rest of the "East Valley" including nearby communities of Indio, Coachella, and unincorporated communities of Bermuda Dunes and Vista Santa Rosa, there is a burgeoning Latino (especially Mexican-American and Central American nationalities) as well an enlargened African American and Asian American (i.e. east Asians) population belonging to the middle and upper-middle class.

According to the United States Hispanic Chamber of Commerce, estimates placed Latinos at half (about 50% to 60%) of the local population, Blacks at near or over 10% and Asians at 10–15% of the city population as of the year 2010. Most of the minorities are recently moved-in families sought starter homes and/or relocated from urban centers of Southern California during the 1990s and 2000s, and from families of two or more races (to represent multiracial identity).

Government

The post office is named the Corporal Hunter Lopez Memorial Post Office Building. Lopez grew up in Indio and attended La Quinta High School.

Public safety
Police services are provided under contract with the Riverside County Sheriff's Department through the Thermal Station, which also serves the city of Coachella and unincorporated areas of the eastern Coachella Valley.

The city of La Quinta contracts for fire and paramedic services with the Riverside County Fire Department through a cooperative agreement with CAL FIRE.

American Medical Response provides ambulance services to La Quinta.

Transportation
La Quinta is located south of Interstate 10 and is served by California State Route 111, the main arterial route through the Coachella Valley.

The city is part of the SunBus line, which services much of the Coachella Valley.

Education

Libraries
The city has a public library that began operations in 2005.

Public schools
The Desert Sands Unified School District services the entire city of La Quinta, and maintains the following public schools:

Elementary
 Harry S. Truman Elementary School
 Benjamin Franklin Elementary School, an IB World School
 Amelia Earhart Elementary School of International Studies, an IB World School

Middle school
 La Quinta Middle School, opened in 1987, a charter school.
 Colonel Mitchell Paige Middle School on the city limits with Palm Desert.
 John Glenn Middle School of Intermediate Studies in nearby Indio.

High school
 La Quinta High School, an IB World School
 Summit High School, an alternative/independent studies school

STEM schools
 John Adams Early Childhood Education Center, formerly Elementary school until 2016.
 George Washington Carver Elementary School

Alternative schools
 Summit High School, a continuation high school opened in 2006, next to Mitchell Paige Middle School.
 Horizon High School and Horizon Middle School located next to the Desert Sands Unified School District administration building.

Parks
The city of La Quinta has 20 parks:
 Adams Park
 Bear Creek Trail Park
 Colonel Mitchell Paige Soccer Fields
 Cove Oasis
 Desert Pride Park
 Eisenhower Park
 Frances Hack Community Park and YMCA
 Fred Wolff Nature Reserve
 Fritz Burns-La Quinta Community Pool Park
 La Quinta Baseball Fields Park and Gerald Ford Boys and Girls Club Center
 La Quinta Civic Center Park
 La Quinta Trails (hiking and bike trails)
 La Quinta-Westward Ho Park
 Monticello Park
 Pioneer Park
 Saguaro Park
 Seasons Park
 Southside-Santa Rosa Park
 Velasco Park
 Yucatán Park

Lake Cahuilla Regional Park is a Riverside County park, and the Santa Rosa and San Jacinto Mountains National Monument is under the US Department of the Interior / National Park Service.

Notable people

The city has been home to a number of celebrity residents, including the late Merv Griffin. Griffin was the driving force behind the annual La Quinta Arts Festival, one of the country's leading plein air art shows, and was instrumental in the development of Griffin Ranch, La Quinta's first equestrian-oriented resort residential neighborhood.

Two city restaurants are owned by notable residents: the Arnold Palmer Restaurant, owned by professional golfer Arnold Palmer, and Devane's Old Town, owned and operated by actor William Devane. Both restaurants are located in the La Quinta Village.

Additionally, the musician/actor Tyler Hilton, professional golfer Anthony Kim, and singer/dancer Aubrey O'Day of Danity Kane were also former residents of La Quinta, and all three attended La Quinta High School.

Colonel Mitchell Paige is a World War II Medal of Honor veteran who resided in nearby Palm Desert and had a middle school in La Quinta named for him.

Tommy John, longtime MLB left-handed pitcher, is a permanent resident.

NFL  player Jeff Webb of the Kansas City Chiefs went to La Quinta High School, though he lived in Indio. Another local and pro football player, Oscar Lua, played for the New England Patriots. Current NFL player James Dockery grew up in neighboring Palm Desert and attended Palm Desert High School.

Scott Burcham, a baseball player in the Colorado Rockies' organization, was born and grew up in La Quinta.

The band Yawning Man formed here.

Singer and TV personality Andy Williams resided in La Quinta with his second wife Debbie in addition to owning a house in Branson, Missouri, where his Moon River theatre was located.

Olympic ice figure skater Dorothy Hamill lived in La Quinta.

Scientology founder L. Ron Hubbard lived in secret on a ranch in La Quinta from 1978 to the early 1980s.

The singer Jack Jones lives in La Quinta.

Other famous seasonal residents include actor Clint Eastwood, motivational speaker Tony Robbins, 1970s–80s singing couple Captain & Tennille (Daryl Dragon and Toni Tennille), Flip or Flop's Tarek El Moussa, and a number of professional golfers, including Fred Couples and Monte Scheinblum and Nike founder and CEO until 2016, Phil Knight.

References

Further reading

External links

 
 The Desert Sun, Coachella Valley Newspaper
 La Quinta Chamber of Commerce
 

La Quinta, California
1982 establishments in California
Cities in Riverside County, California
Coachella Valley
Incorporated cities and towns in California
Populated places established in 1926
Populated places in the Colorado Desert